Pronto may refer to:

Transport
Ford Pronto, a vehicle rebadged Suzuki Carry
Pronto (smart card), a contactless smart card used for public transit in San Diego, California
Pronto Cycle Share, a defunct bicycle-sharing system in Seattle, Washington
Pronto (bus service), operating between Manchester and Chesterfield in the UK

Places
Pronto, Alabama, a community in the United States
Pronto Mine, in Ontario, Canada

Other uses
Pronto (magazine), a Spanish celebrity weekly
Pronto (novel), by Elmore Leonard
"Pronto" (Snoop Dogg song)
Pronto, a chain of cafes in Japan managed by Suntory
Pronto, alternate name in some countries for S. C. Johnson's Pledge cleaning product
Pronto, a brand of touchscreen remote control
Plymouth Pronto, a concept car released in 1997
Pronto Airways, a Canadian airline
Pronto Computers, a defunct American computer company
Pronto condoms, released in South Africa
Pronto Software, an Australian company
Pronto.com, an Internet-based price comparison service